Pulfrich Peak is a peak near the east part of Wild Spur on Arctowski Peninsula, on the west coast of Graham Land. Mapped by the Falkland Islands Dependencies Survey (FIDS) from photos taken by Hunting Aerosurveys Ltd. in 1956–57. Named by the United Kingdom Antarctic Place-Names Committee (UK-APC) in 1960 for Carl Pulfrich (1858–1927), "father of stereophotogrammetry," who independently developed a stereocomparator in 1901 and developed the principle of the "floating mark" established by Franz Stolze.

Mountains of Graham Land
Danco Coast